Michael Wandesford was an Anglican priest in the early seventeenth century.

The brother of Christopher Wandesford,  who was to be Lord Deputy of Ireland in 1640, he was appointed Dean of Limerick in May 1635;   and  Dean of Derry in November 1635.

He died in 1637.

References

17th-century Irish Anglican priests
Deans of Limerick
Deans of Derry
1637 deaths